Lorraine Pintal OC, (born September 24, 1951) is a Canadian actor, director, producer and playwright.

Biography
She debuted with the Théâtre du Nouveau Monde in 1973 in Mistero Buffo. In the same year, she was a co-founder of the Théâtre de La Rallonge. She wrote and acted in the one woman performance Madame Louis 14.

Pintal has been artistic director for the Théâtre du Nouveau Monde since 1992.

As a stage director, she was recognized by the Association québécoise des critiques de théâtre (AQCT) for HA ha !... in 1990 and Hosanna in 1991. Les oranges sont vertes received a Masque Award in 1998 for best staging and best production. She received a Gascon-Thomas Award in 2001 from the National Theatre School of Canada.

In 2002, she was named to the Order of Canada.

In 2014, she was an unsuccessful Parti Québécois candidate in the Quebec riding of Verdun, losing to Liberal Jacques Daoust.

In 2019, she was the recipient of a Lifetime Artistic Achievement Award as part of the Governor General's Performing Arts Awards.

References

External links 
 

1951 births
Living people
Actresses from Quebec
Canadian television producers
Canadian women television producers
Canadian theatre directors
Members of the Order of Canada
Canadian women dramatists and playwrights
20th-century Canadian dramatists and playwrights
20th-century Canadian women writers
20th-century Canadian actresses
Canadian stage actresses
People from Centre-du-Québec
Canadian dramatists and playwrights in French
Writers from Quebec